Schwartzeneggar was a band formed by ex-Crass vocalist Steve Ignorant, Thatcher on Acid members, Ben Corrigan (guitar, b. vocals), Andi Tuck (drums), Bob Butler (bass), and former Conflict member Mark Pickstone (keyboards/guitar).

Bassist Bob Butler died in 2022.

Discography

Albums
 Take Your Elbows Off The Table, EP (1993)
 The Way Things Are ... And Other Stories (1993)

Singles
 "Goodbye To All That/Child of the Times" (1992)
 "Art XX Craft"/"Sad life" (1993)
 "Take Your Elbows Off The Table"/"Today" (1993)
 "New World, New Song/I Want My Life", recorded live at MKNZ, Ilirska Bistrica, Slovenia, on 27 October 1995. (limited edition 7" yellow vinyl)

Full gig history 1993–1995

References

External links
 

Anarcho-punk groups
Crass
English punk rock groups